Petrovsky is a rural locality (a settlement) in Starooskolsky District, Belgorod Oblast, Russia. The population was 121 as of 2010. There is 1 street.

Geography 
Petrovsky is located 42 km southeast of Stary Oskol (the district's administrative centre) by road. Malotroitskoye is the nearest rural locality.

References 

Rural localities in Starooskolsky District